The Princess fleet is an eponym for the coastal vessels of the Canadian Pacific Railway (CPR) in the first half of the 20th century.  The names of these small ocean liners began with the title "Princess."

The ships of the British Columbia Coast Steamships came to be called "pocket liners" because they  offered amenities like a great ocean liner, but on a smaller scale.  The CPR princesses were a coastal counterpart to CPR's "Empress" fleet of passenger liners which sailed on trans-Pacific and trans-Atlantic routes.

James William Troup is credited with conceiving and building the Princess fleet.  In 1913, 10 of the 12 Princess ships in the coastal fleet had been built to the orders of Capt. Troup.

  
{|  border=1 style="border-collapse: collapse"
|-
!colspan="7" |
|-
!colspan="7" |PRINCESSES OF THE CANADIAN PACIFIC STEAMSHIP FLEET
|- 
!colspan="7" |
|- 
!  width="5%"  | Active Service
!  width="20%" | Vessel Name
!  width="5%"  | Launch Date
!  width="5%"  | Maiden Voyage
!  width="40%" | Other Names
!  width="20%" | Notes
!  width="5%"  | Loss / Decommission Date
|-
!colspan="7" |
|-
!colspan="7" |Canadian Pacific Railway (1884–1915)
|-
!colspan="7" |
|-

| 1869
| Princess Louise
| 1869
| 1869
| Olympia (1869–79)
|  
| 1906
|-

| 1888  
| Princess May
| 1888 
| 1888
| SS Arthur, 1888–1896; SS Cass, 1896; SS Ninghchow, 1896–1899; SS Hating, 1899–1901  
|  
| 1935
|-

| 1902  
| SS Princess Patricia I
| 1902 
| 1902
| SS Queen Alexandra, 1902–1912 
|  
| 1937
|-

| 1903  
| Princess Beatrice
| 1903 
| 1903
|  
|  
| 1929
|-

| 1903  
| SS Princess Victoria
| 1902 
| 1903
|Tahsis No. 3, 1951-1953
|converted oil carrier
| 1953
|-

| 1907  
| SS Princess Ena 
| 1907
| 1907
|  
|  
| 1936
|-

| 1907
| Princess Royal
| 1907 
| 1907
|  
|  
| 1933
|-

| 1908  
| SS Princess Charlotte
|  
|  
| SS Mediterranean, 1950–1965
|  
| 1965
|-

| 1910  
| SS Princess Adelaide
| 1910
| 1910
| SS Angelika, 1949–1967
|  
| 1967
|-

| 1910
| SS Princess Mary
| 1910
| 1910
|  
|  
| 1954
|-

| 1911
| SS Princess Alice
| 1911
| 1911
| SS Aegaeon, 1949–1966
| Pacific coast, 1911–1949; Mediterranean, 1949–1966 
| 1966 
|-

| 1912
| SS Princess Sophia
| 1911
| 1912
|  
| Pacific coast, 1912–1918
| 1918
|-

| 1913
| SS Princess Maquinna
| 1912
| 1913
|  
| 
| 1962 
|-

| 1913
| 
| 1913
| 1913
| SS Daily 1913–1918, SS Cy Peck, 1930–1986
|  
| 1986
|-

| 1914
| SS Princess Margaret
| 1914
| 1914
|  
| 
| 1929 
|-

| 1915
| SS Princess Irene
| 1914
| 1915
|  
| converted minesweeper, blew up Sheerness 27.5.15
| 1915
|-
!colspan="7" |
|-
!colspan="7" |Canadian Pacific Steamships Ocean Services Ltd. (1915–1971)
|-
!colspan="7" |
|-

| 1921  
| SS Princess Louise
| 1921 
| 1921
|  
| U.S. Largest Floating Restaurant, Los Angeles Harbor 1966
| 1990
|-

| 1923  
| MV Motor Princess
| 1923 
| 1923
| MV Pender Queen, 1961–1980
| sold as a hotel at Saltspring Island, BC in 1981
|  
|-

| 1925 
| SS Princess Kathleen
| 1924
| 1925
|  
| Pacific coast, 1925–1939; war years, 1939–1947; Pacific coast, 1947–1952
| 1952
|-

| 1925 
| SS Princess Marguerite I
| 1924
| 1925
|  
|  
| 1942
|-

| 1928  
| SS Princess Elaine
| 1927
| 1928
|  
| floating restaurant, Seattle 1963-71
| 1976
|-

| 1928  
| Princess Norah
| 1928 
| 1928
| SS Queen of the North, 1955–1958; SS Canadian Prince, 1958–1964
|  
| 1964
|-

| 1930  
| SS Princess Elizabeth
| 1930 
| 1930
| SS Pegasus, 1961–1973; SS Highland Queen, 1973–1976
|  
| 1976
|-
| 1930  
| SS Princess Helene
| 1930
| 1930
| SS Helene, 1963–1965; SS Carina II, 1965–1967; SS Carina, 1967–1977
| Bay of Fundy, 1930–1963 
| 1977
|-
| 1930  
| SS Princess Joan
| 1930 
| 1930
| SS Hermes, 1961–1974
|  
| 1974
|-
| 1944  
| SS Trailer Princess
| 1944 
| 1944
| SS  Coronis, 1944–1966
|  
|  
|-
| 1945  
| SS Princess of Alberni
| 1945 
| 1945
| SS Pomare, 1948–1953; SS Nootka Prince''', 1958-1959; SS Ocean Crown, 1959-1985
|  
| 1985
|-
| 1946  
| SS Yukon Princess
| 1945 
| 1946
| SS West Princess, 1959; SS Rosita, 1959-1964 
|  
| 1964
|-
| 1949  
| TEV Princess Marguerite II
| 1948 
| 1949
|  
|  
| 1996
|-
| 1949  
| TEV Princess Patricia II| 1948 
| 1949
|  
|  
| 1989
|-
| 1950  
| SS Princess of Nanaimo
| 1950
| 1951
| SS Princess of Acadia, 1963-1971; MV Princess of Nanaimo, 1971-73; SS Henry Osborne, 1973-1974 
| Pacific coast, 1949-1963; Bay of Fundy, 1963-1971
| 1974
|-
| 1955  
| MV Princess of Vancouver
| 1955 
| 1955
| MV Vancouver Island Princess, 1987-1993; MV Nan Hai Ming Zhu, 1991-2001; MV Pearl of South China Sea, 2001- 
| Pacific coast, 1955-1990
|  
|-
| 1971  
| MV Princess of Acadia
| 1971 
| 1971
|  
| Bay of Fundy, 1971-
|  
|-
|-
|}

Former ferries of CP Steamships that were absorbed by Washington Marine Group (WMG) in 1998. Two years before WMG had gained full control of Seaspan.

See also
 CP Ships

Notes

References
 Fournier, Leslie Thomas. (1935). Railway Nationalization in Canada: the Problem of the Canadian National Railways. Toronto: Macmillan. OCLC 424018532
 Hacking, Norman R. (1995). Prince Ships of Northern B.C.: Ships of the Grand Trunk Pacific and Canadian National Railways. Surrey, British Columbia: Heritage House. ;  OCLC 31778600
 __ and W. Kaye Lamb. (1974). The Princess Story: a century and a half of West Coast shipping. Vancouver : Mitchell Press. OCLC 2973754
Morley, Alan. (1961). Vancouver; from Milltown to Metropolis. Vancouver: Mitchell. http://www.worldcat.org/title/vancouver-from-milltown-to-metropolis/oclc/70456349  OCLC 70456349]
 Musk, George. (1981).  Canadian Pacific: The Story of the Famous Shipping Line.  Toronto: Holt, Rinehart and Winston of Canada. ;  OCLC 7540915
 Turner, Robert D. (1974). The Pacific Princesses: an illustrated history of Canadian Pacific Railway's Princess fleet on the Northwest Coast. Winlaw, British Columbia: Sono Nis Press.  OCLC 254451187
 __. (1987). West of the Great Divide : an Illustrated History of the Canadian Pacific Railway in British Columbia, 1880-1986.'' Victoria, British Columbia: Sono Nis Press. ;  OCLC 16019694

Princess fleet